Aloo mutter (also spelled aloo mattar or aloo matar or alu) is a vegetarian North Indian dish from the Indian subcontinent which is made from potatoes (Aloo) and peas (mattar) in a mildly spiced creamy tomato based gravy. It is a vegetarian dish. The gravy base is generally cooked with garlic, ginger, onion, tomatoes, cilantro (coriander), cumin seeds, red chilli, turmeric, garam masala, and many other spices. It can also be made without onion or garlic.

Aloo mutter is also available commercially in ready-to-eat packets, which need to be heated and served. It is also used as a filling in some variations of dosa. It is served in most North Indian restaurants and is one of the most iconic dishes of North Indian cuisine featured in the West.

See also
 Aloo gobi
 Keema Matar
 List of legume dishes

References

Punjabi cuisine
Indian legume dishes
Pakistani legume dishes